Ruth Howe (born 14 May 1959) is a British rower. She competed in the women's coxless pair event at the 1984 Summer Olympics. She was part of the coxless pairs with Jackie Prout that won the national title rowing for a Lea Rowing Club and Sons of the Thames composite at the 1986 National Championships. She was a member of the eight that won the national title rowing for a A.R.A squad at the 1987 National Championships.

References

External links
 

1959 births
Living people
British female rowers
Olympic rowers of Great Britain
Rowers at the 1984 Summer Olympics
Sportspeople from Tavistock